Depth of field can refer to:

 Depth of field, in optics, the distance about the plane of focus (POF) where objects appear acceptably sharp in an image
 Depth of Field (album), album by Sarah Blasko (2018)
 Depth of Field, record label founded in 1997 by Bobby Previte
 Depth of Field, film production company founded by Paul Weitz